Sono, SONO, or SoNo may refer to:

Places
 SoNo, Atlanta, a district in the city of Atlanta, Georgia
 Sono Department, a department in Burkina Faso
 South Norfolk, Virginia, a former independent city in the South Hampton Roads region of eastern Virginia and is now a section of the city of Chesapeake
 South Norwalk, Connecticut or "SoNo", a neighborhood in Norwalk, Connecticut
 Sono, Jamui, a village in the Indian state of Bihar
 SoNo Collection, an upscale shopping mall in Norwalk, Connecticut

People with the surname 
, Japanese writer
 Sion Sono, Japanese filmmaker

Music groups
 SONO (vocal group), an a cappella music group from Denmark
 Sono (band), a band from Germany

Other uses
Sono arsenic filter, a water filter
Sono Motors, a German electric carmaker, behind the Sion (electric car)

Japanese-language surnames